KPBS-FM (89.5 MHz) is a non-commercial public radio station broadcasting in San Diego, California, affiliated with National Public Radio (NPR).  It is owned by San Diego State University as part of KPBS Public Media, and is a sister station to PBS member KPBS-TV (channel 15). The two outlets share studios located on the SDSU campus at The Conrad Prebys Media Complex at Copley Center on Campanile Drive in San Diego. KPBS-FM's transmitter is located on San Miguel Mountain in southwestern San Diego County.

In addition, KPBS-FM operates on the following  transmitters:  89.1 MHz K206AC in La Jolla, and on 97.7 MHz KQVO in Calexico, Imperial County.  The station airs programming consisting of news and public affairs.  Beginning May 23, 2011, the station discontinued its classical music programming in the evening hours and moved music programming to an online stream.

The station first went on the air in 1960 as KEBS, owned by what was then San Diego State College. It changed its call letters to the current KPBS-FM in 1970. It is one of three charter members of NPR in California, the others being KCRW in Los Angeles and KQED-FM in San Francisco. As such, it was one of the 90 stations that aired the initial broadcast of All Things Considered when it premiered in 1971.

KPBS aired predominantly classical music until mid-1990s, when it started adding more news to its format. In 2006 classical music migrated to an HD Radio multicast channel, and KPBS-FM switched to an all-news format. In 2009 the radio, TV and digital news operations of KPBS were merged into a single content-producing division. This allowed to produce television and radio news simultaneously.

Presently, KPBS has three HD Radio channels. KPBS-HD1 is a digital simulcast of the main analog channel that airs NPR news and talk shows; KPBS-HD2 airs "Classical San Diego", featuring music from the syndicated Classical 24 service; KPBS-HD3 offers SomaFM's syndicated "Groove Salad" format.

The KPBS Radio Reading Service broadcasts the readings of newspapers, books, and magazines to those with low vision, blindness, and other impairments. The Reading Service is available 24 hours a day over a private audio channel, and online via audio webstream.

On October 1, 2012, KPBS boosted its effective radiated power from 2,700 watts to 26,000 watts by moving its tower from San Miguel Mountain to Mount Soledad.

San Diego wildfires 

During the October 2007 wildfires in the San Diego area, power was lost to the KPBS-FM/TV transmitter on Mount San Miguel.

Within three hours, alternative rock station KBZT agreed to air KPBS' wildfire coverage until the station could return to a backup operation from its studios on the San Diego State University campus, which occurred the next day. KPBS later restored full coverage from Mount San Miguel using a backup generator.

References

External links
KPBS-FM Website
NPR: KPBS Radio Covers Wildfires Using Many Sources
KPBS-FM stays on air, with help

PBS-FM
NPR member stations
San Diego State University
PBS-FM
HD Radio stations